Donald Ray Goode (born June 21, 1951), was an NFL linebacker from 1974 to 1981.  He went to Booker T. Washington High School.  He played college football at the University of Kansas and was selected in the 1st round (15th overall) by the San Diego Chargers in the 1974 NFL Draft.  He would play for the Chargers until the 1980 season, where he played for the Cleveland Browns in his last two seasons.

1951 births
Living people
American football linebackers
Kansas Jayhawks football players
San Diego Chargers players
Cleveland Browns players